UFC 152: Jones vs. Belfort  was a mixed martial arts pay-per-view event held by the Ultimate Fighting Championship on September 22, 2012, at the Air Canada Centre in Toronto, Ontario, Canada.

Background
Rory MacDonald was expected to face former dual-division champion B.J. Penn at the event, but MacDonald pulled out of the bout after sustaining a cut to the forehead while training. The bout was rescheduled for UFC on Fox 5 on December 8, 2012.

UFC newcomer Roger Hollett was expected to face Matt Hamill, who returned from retirement, at the event. However, Hollett was forced out of the bout due to a contract dispute and replaced by Vladimir Matyushenko. Then, on September 11, 2012, Matyushenko pulled out of the fight after suffering a torn Achilles tendon while training, and Hamill vs. Hollett was rebooked by UFC officials.

A bout between Evan Dunham and T. J. Grant was originally supposed to be contested on the main card but was instead fought on the FX prelims, for unknown reasons.

As a result of the cancellation of UFC 151, a bout between Kyle Noke and Charlie Brenneman was rescheduled for this event.

Dan Miller was expected to face Sean Pierson at the event.  However, Miller pulled out of the bout after getting news about his son's kidney transplant operation. He was replaced by Lance Benoist.

At the weigh-ins, Charles Oliveira failed to make weight by four tenths of pound on his first try.
In the second, he was able to make 146.2 lb. However, his opponent signed to fight at a catchweight, and Oliveira was not fined.

Main event

The main event was UFC Light Heavyweight Champion Jon Jones facing former champion Vitor Belfort. Originally, Jones was set to defend his title against Dan Henderson at UFC 151 on September 1, 2012, in Las Vegas, Nevada, but UFC President Dana White announced on August 23, 2012, that Henderson had a tear in his MCL and would not be able to compete. It was then revealed that Jones declined a fight against Chael Sonnen, who offered to take the fight on eight days notice. As a result, the event was cancelled. This marked the first time the UFC had cancelled an event, with the official fight card having been announced, in the organization's history.

Following the cancellation of the event, White said that UFC 151 simply will not exist. Jones was set to face Lyoto Machida in a rematch at this event after the cancellation of that event, but Machida declined the fight. Subsequently, Belfort was chosen to take Machida's place. Jones was a massive favorite coming into the bout. It was later reported that Belfort fought Jones with a broken hand. He also had elevated free testosterone levels found on a pre-fight test

Results

Flyweight Championship bracket

1 The initial semifinal bout between Johnson and McCall at UFC on FX 2 ended in a draw. Johnson defeated McCall in a rematch at UFC on FX 3.

Bonus awards

Fighters were awarded $65,000 bonuses.

Fight of the Night: T. J. Grant vs. Evan Dunham
Knockout of the Night: Cub Swanson
Submission of the Night: Jon Jones

See also
List of UFC events
2012 in UFC

References

External links
Official UFC past events page
UFC events results at Sherdog.com

Ultimate Fighting Championship events
Events in Toronto
2012 in mixed martial arts
Mixed martial arts in Canada
Sports competitions in Toronto
2012 in Canadian sports